Hydroscapha natans is a species of skiff beetle in the family Hydroscaphidae. It is found in North America.

References

Further reading

External links

 

Myxophaga
Articles created by Qbugbot
Beetles described in 1874
Beetles of North America